Vieremä is a municipality of Finland in the Northern Savonia region.

Municipality is unilingually Finnish.

Ponsse, one of the world’s largest forest machine manufacturers is headquartered in Vieremä.

History
Municipality of Vieremä was founded in 1922. Before it, Vieremä was a part of Iisalmen maalaiskunta.

Geography 
Neighbouring municipalities are Iisalmi, Kajaani, Kiuruvesi, Pyhäntä, and Sonkajärvi.

Villages
 Valkeiskylä
 Kaarakkala
 Karankamäki
 Kirkonkylä
 Rotimojoki
 Nissilä,
 Palosenjärvi
 Palosenmäki
 Pyöree
 Salahmi
 Savimäki

Climate

Vieremä Music
Vieremä has an active musical life, despite its small size. Vieremä has long traditions in folk and religious music, and it is especially known for its active kantele-playing scene. A kantele camp for young players is organized every summer, and Vieremä church and Kyrönniemi Center of Culture and Religion host many concerts throughout the year.

 Notable music groups
The Vieremä Veteran Choir often tours Finland and released a CD in 2004.
Vieremän Kanteletytöt (Vieremä Kantele Girls) is one of Finland's most well-known kantele groups.
Jumalan Ruoska (The Whip Of God) is an eccentric punk rock trio that has released records on the independent label Ässä-levyt and gained international recognition in underground circles.
Pekka "The Cat" Ryhänen is a Christian metal guitarist/songwriter. He is originally from Kauppilanmäki, a small village in the Vieremä municipality.

Notable people
 Iivo Niskanen
 Kerttu Niskanen
 Eva Ryynänen

References

External links

Municipality of Vieremä – Official website 

Municipalities of North Savo
Populated places established in 1922